Regdanvimab, sold under the brand name Regkirona, is a human monoclonal antibody used for the treatment of COVID-19. The antibody is directed against the spike protein of SARS-CoV-2. It is developed by Celltrion. The medicine is given by infusion (drip) into a vein.

The most common side effects include infusion-related reactions, including allergic reactions and anaphylaxis.

Regdanvimab was approved for medical use in the European Union in November 2021.

Medical uses 
In the European Union, regdanvimab is indicated for the treatment of adults with COVID-19 who do not require supplemental oxygen and who are at increased risk of progressing to severe COVID-19.

Society and culture

Legal status 
In March 2021, the Committee for Medicinal Products for Human Use (CHMP) of the European Medicines Agency (EMA) started a rolling review of data on regdanvimab. In October 2021, the EMA started evaluating an application for marketing authorization for the monoclonal antibody regdanvimab (Regkirona) to treat adults with COVID-19 who do not require supplemental oxygen therapy and who are at increased risk of progressing to severe COVID-19. The applicant is Celltrion Healthcare Hungary Kft. The European Medicines Agency (EMA) concluded that regdanvimab can be used for the treatment of confirmed COVID-19 in adults who do not require supplemental oxygen therapy and who are at high risk of progressing to severe COVID-19.

In November 2021, the Committee for Medicinal Products for Human Use (CHMP) of the European Medicines Agency (EMA) recommended granting a marketing authorization in the European Union for regdanvimab (Regkirona) for the treatment of COVID-19. The company that applied for authorization of Regkirona is Celltrion Healthcare Hungary Kft. Regdanvimab was approved for medical use in the European Union in November 2021.

Names 
Regdanvimab is the international nonproprietary name (INN).

References

Further reading

External links 
 

Antiviral drugs
Experimental drugs
COVID-19 drug development
Monoclonal antibodies